McLevy is a British radio crime drama series, written by David Ashton, about the 19th century Edinburgh police detective James McLevy. Broadcast on BBC Radio 4 as part of its Afternoon Drama slot, the drama stars Brian Cox and Siobhan Redmond, with Michael Perceval-Maxwell and David Ashton.

Main cast
 Inspector James McLevy, played by Brian Cox
 Jean Brash, played by Siobhan Redmond
 Constable Martin Mulholland, played by Michael Perceval-Maxwell (Series 1-12)
 Lieutenant Robert Roach, played by David Ashton (Series 1-12)

In the 1999 pilot play, Phyllis Logan played Jean and John Paul Hurley played Mulholland. Lieutenant Roach was not introduced until the actual first episode of Series One; in the pilot play, McLevy's superior was Lieutenant Moxey, with the change in command explained as Moxey having been "elevated" to The Haymarket (in the novel Shadow of the Serpent, the explanation is that Moxey "had left somewhat under a cloud and Roach had been swiftly drafted in from Haymarket to fill the gap ...").

Supporting cast
 Jessie Nairn (2000–2002, played by Tracey Wiles), Jean Brash's right-hand woman and "Keeper of Keys" of "The Happy Land" and "The Just Land" until she was stabbed to death by a hired killer.
 Hannah Semple (2003–2012, 2015–2016, played by Collette O'Neil), who took over as Jean's "Keeper of Keys"; in Series 9, she had to flee Leith after killing a deranged sword-wielding "client" to protect Jean but returned in Series 11.
 Constable Miller (2000–2003, played by Tom Smith), a rather inept constable who was killed in the line of duty preventing an assassination attempt on Queen Victoria; unfortunately, to McLevy's fury, because of the would-be assassin's identity, higher authorities swept the attempt under the carpet and the "official" version of Miller's death was that he had been stabbed to death by "a sneak thief".  His stationhouse duties were taken over after his death by Constable Ballantyne, played by Finlay McLean.
 "The Countess" (2002, played by Maureen Beattie), Jean Brash's chief rival in the brothel trade.  During a power struggle between herself and Jean, she tried to have Jean framed for murder but was ultimately jailed herself as an accomplice to that murder; it was revealed in Series 5 that she died in prison.
 Donald McIver (played by Andrew Neil), Hannah Semple's former boyfriend and an inveterate gambler who married Hannah in Series 5, but sadly was later shot and killed when a high-stakes card game he was playing in was held up by two men with a pistol.
 Inspector Adam Dunsmore of the Haymarket district (played by Simon Tait in Series 5, later Forbes Masson in Series 11), later transferred to Princes Street; McLevy despises him as both an inefficient investigator and being more interested in furthering his own career than in solving crimes.
 Chief Constable Murray Craddock (introduced in Series 10, played in Series 10 and 12 by Paul Young and by David Robb in Series 11), a self-righteous and intolerant man who is determined to purge Edinburgh (and especially Leith) of what he considers immorality (McLevy finally demonstrates how he feels about Craddock in the final episode of Series 12, "The Last Goodbye").

Format
While some of the series contain a thread connecting all of that series' stories into one storyline, the elements of each of the stories remain constant:
 McLevy's single-minded pursuit of and for justice on his beat (the parish of Leith in the city of Edinburgh) no matter which class of people are involved;
 His frustration with and contempt for "respectability" and its hypocrisy, especially when the truth about a crime is covered up to protect upper-class people involved but a crime committed by lower-class people is severely punished;
 His often-stormy but complex (and in Series 10 "intimate" following events at the end of Series 7) relationship with Jean Brash, the owner and operator of "The Happy Land" (until it was burned down by vigilantes) and later "The Just Land" (so named to annoy McLevy), the "best bawdy-hoose" (brothel) in Edinburgh;
 His equally complex working relationship (and friendship, although neither would ever admit to it) with Irish-born Constable Mulholland, McLevy's partner in investigations;
 His clashes with his long-suffering, class- and politically-conscious and wife-dominated superior Lieutenant Roach (who nevertheless realized that McLevy's methods produced the desired results and therefore was not above turning a blind eye and occasionally even backing McLevy).

The historicity of the series is not always faultless. For example, an episode on 24 March 2015 involved a robbery of the British Linen Bank, although that bank did not obtain that title until 1906.

List of Episodes

Series 1

Series 2

Series 3

Series 4

Series 5

Series 6

Series 7

Series 8

Series 9

Series 10

Series 11

Series 12

McLevy in the New World

Specials

In other media
All episodes of series 1-12 are currently available on both CD, audio download and with the exception of the pilot episode can be listened to for free on BBC Sounds.

References

External links
 
 Radio Listings – McLevy

British radio dramas
BBC Radio 4 programmes
BBC Radio dramas
1999 radio programme debuts
2016 radio programme endings
Detective radio shows